Sikhote-Alin Nature Reserve is a Russian 'zapovednik' (strict nature reserve) in Primorsky Krai. It is an important reserve for the endangered Siberian tiger.

It was founded on February 10, 1935, to protect a population of the sable. The Sikhote-Alin Nature Reserve is located in a watershed on the eastern slopes of Central Sikhote-Alin in the Terneysky and Krasnoarmeysky Districts and the area of Dalnegorsk City Council.

The area of the zapovednik is 401,428 ha (2,900 ha - aquatic). The highest point is Glukhomanka Mountain at 1598 m altitude.

Hunting and fishing in Sikhote-Alin Nature Reserve are forbidden. Flora and fauna of the reserve are rich.

The reserve, along with Ussurisky Nature Reserve, is featured in the natural film Operation Snow Tiger by the BBC, first aired in 2013.

References

External links
  Info about Sikhote-Alin Nature Reserve
  Sikhote-Alin Nature Reserve
  Wild Russia. Sikhote-Alin Zapovednik

External links

.01
Nature reserves in Russia
Geography of Primorsky Krai
Protected areas of the Russian Far East
Zapovednik
1935 establishments in Russia
Protected areas established in 1935